Orlando Phidelio Boss was a corporal in Company F, 25th Massachusetts Volunteer Infantry during the American Civil War. He received Medal of Honor for his bravery at the Battle of Cold Harbor, Virginia on June 3, 1864. Prior to rescuing Lieutenant Daly of his regiment, he had dragged another wounded comrade to safety among the enemy fire. He had then appealed to his brigade commander, General George J. Stannard, for permission to rescue the lieutenant. General Stannard consented, and Boss succeeded in bringing the wounded office despite a torrent of enemy gunfire that erupted at him during his deed.

Boss joined the Army from his hometown of Fitchburg, Massachusetts in September 1861, and mustered out in October 1864.

Medal of Honor citation
Boss' official Medal of Honor citation reads:
The President of the United States of America, in the name of Congress, takes pleasure in presenting the Medal of Honor to Corporal Orlando Phidelio Boss, United States Army, for extraordinary heroism on 3 June 1864, while serving with Company F, 25th Massachusetts Infantry, in action at Cold Harbor, Virginia. Corporal Boss rescued his lieutenant, who was lying between the lines mortally wounded; this under a heavy fire of the enemy.

See also

List of Medal of Honor recipients
List of American Civil War Medal of Honor recipients: A–F

Notes

References

External links
Civil War

Military Times

1844 births
1931 deaths
People from Fitchburg, Massachusetts
People of Massachusetts in the American Civil War
Union Army soldiers
United States Army Medal of Honor recipients
American Civil War recipients of the Medal of Honor